Love People is the fifth studio album by Tongan-American family band The Jets, released on September 5th, 1995. It was released by the band's own independent label, Liberty Park Records.

It was the first release from the band in over 6 years, their previous record being 1989's "Believe".

Track listing
 "Love People"
 "Need Your Love"
 "One More Try"
 "Ooh Baby"
 "Trust Me"
 "No Time to Lose"
 "Moonlight"
 "Sweet Melody"
 "Everybody Dance"
 "Keep Believing"
 "Never Love Again"
 "I Stand All Amazed"

References

1995 albums
The Jets (band) albums